The 1966 Cork Intermediate Hurling Championship was the 57th staging of the Cork Intermediate Hurling Championship since its establishment by the Cork County Board in 1909.

Cloyne won the championship following a 4–11 to 3–06 defeat of Cobh in the final. This was their first ever championship title in this grade.

References

Cork Intermediate Hurling Championship
Cork Intermediate Hurling Championship